The Polytechnic University of the Philippines Open University System is the nontraditional/distance studies unit of the Polytechnic University of the Philippines.  It began with the offering of non-degree (technical-vocational) courses in 1970s and was formally established in 1990, making it the first open learning institution in the country. It is one of the only two open learning institutions in the Philippines recognized by the UNESCO Asia Pacific Knowledge Base on Open and Distance Learning.  

The PUP Open University was established to provide education opportunities to individuals aspiring for higher education and improved qualifications but were unable to take advantage of traditional modes of education because of personal and professional obligations. It is also known as the "Pamantasang Bayan," literally translating as "Nation's University" in Filipino.

Academics

Institutes and center
PUP Open University consists of three units: Institute of Open and Distance Education/Transnational Education, Institute of Non-Traditional Studies Program and ETEEAP, and the Center of Professional and Continuing Studies, under which the Nontraditional Study Program and Expanded Tertiary Education Equivalency and Accreditation Program are under.

Institute of Open and Distance Education/Transnational Education
Institute of Open and Distance Education / Transnational Education allows students to learn independently with the guidance of a teacher or tutor online in an online classroom.

Institute of Non-Traditional Studies and ETEEAP
Institute of Non-traditional Studies and ETEEAP gives an opportunity to practitioners and executives to complete their college degrees or graduate programs and earn their diplomas without having to take a leave from the jobs.

Institute for Continuing and Professional Development
Institute for Continuing and Professional Development in collaboration with the Professional Regulations Commission, the Commission on Higher Education, and other government agencies provide courses to enhance an individual's knowledge and skills through integrated industry-based professional development experiences.

Learning Centers

The PUP OU has 9 Learning Centers in strategic locations in the country. Most of the centers are mostly located in other PUP campuses in the selected regions of the country.

In 2007, OU has launched the Open University Learning Management System (PUPOU-LMS or eMabini), where the faculty of the OU can hold classes online to Filipino students in United Arab Emirates, Hong Kong, Singapore, and Vietnam.

References

External links
 Polytechnic University of the Philippines Official website

Polytechnic University of the Philippines
Distance education institutions based in the Philippines
1995 establishments in the Philippines
Educational institutions established in 1995